Kintsvisi is a village in Shida Kartli region of the Republic of Georgia, 7.5 km to the southwest from the town of Kareli. A 13th century Kintsvisi Monastery is situated 1.5 km to the southeast.

References
Закарая, П. (1983) Памятники Восточной Грузии. Искусство, Москва, 376 с. [Zakaraya, P. Monuments of Eastern Georgia](In Russian).

Villages in Shida Kartli